Sir Horace Jones  (20 May 1819 – 21 May 1887) was an English architect particularly noted for his work as architect and surveyor to the City of London from 1864 until his death. He served as president of the Royal Institute of British Architects from 1882 until 1884, and was knighted in 1886. His most recognised work, Tower Bridge, was completed posthumously.

Biography
The son of David Jones, a lawyer, and Sarah Lydia Shephard, Jones was born at 15 Size Lane, Bucklersbury, London. He was articled to John Wallen, an architect and surveyor, of 16 Aldermanbury, and subsequently in 1841–42 travelled to Italy and Greece studying ancient architecture.

In 1843 he commenced practice as an architect at 16 Furnival's Inn, Holborn. Beginning with Cardiff Town Hall (c. 1850–53) and Caversham Park (from c. 1850), he designed and carried out many important buildings, soon coming to concentrate on work in London. He was surveyor for the Duke of Buckingham's Tufnell Park estate, for the Barnard estate, and the Bethnal Green estate.

On 26 February 1864 he was elected architect and surveyor to the City of London, succeeding James Bunstone Bunning. Jones completed projects begun by his predecessor, such as the City Lunatic Asylum at Dartford, and was in charge of several renovations and additions to the Guildhall. He designed and built some of London's most famous markets, in particular Smithfield, Billingsgate and Leadenhall.
He also designed the memorial at Temple Bar, replacing Wren's arch which was a notorious traffic obstacle.

Jones' final legacy is one of the most recognised buildings in the world, Tower Bridge. It was designed in collaboration with the civil engineer John Wolfe Barry, who was brought in as an expert to devise the mechanism for the bascule bridge. Following Jones' death during the initial stages of construction, the execution lay in the hands of Barry.

Jones became an associate of the Royal Institute of British Architects in 1842, a fellow in 1855 and served as the institute's president from 1882 to 1883. He was knighted on 30 July 1886. He was a freemason, and from 1882 until his death was Grand Superintendent of Works.

Jones married Ann Elizabeth Patch, the daughter of John Patch, a barrister,  on 15 April 1875. He died at 30 Devonshire Place, Portland Place, London, on 21 May 1887, and was buried in West Norwood Cemetery on 27 May. A portrait of Jones by Walter William Ouless RA was exhibited at the Royal Academy Exhibition in 1887.

Works
All in London unless otherwise stated.

Destroyed
Cardiff Town Hall, c. 1850–53, demolished 1913.
Marshall & Snelgrove's department store, Oxford Street, 1850s.
Surrey Music Hall, Newington, 1856.
Sovereign Assurance offices, Piccadilly, 1857.
British and Irish Magnetic Telegraph Company's office, Threadneedle Street, 1859. A contemporary account refers to the building's "rather fanciful, and very ornate French Renaiassance facade, crowned by a lofty clock-tower."
Council Chamber, Guildhall, 1884.
Bishopsgate Police Station, 1866, demolished 1930s

Extant
Caversham Park, Oxfordshire, c. 1850 (now within the borough of Reading, Berkshire).
Smithfield Market. Built in three stages: Central Meat Market, 1866–67; Poultry and Provision Market, 1873–5 (burnt 1958); Fruit and Vegetable Market, 1879–83.
Foreign Cattle Market, 1871. Conversion of Convoys Wharf, Deptford.
Library and Museum, Guildhall, 1872 (now fulfilling different functions).
Billingsgate Market, 1874-78 (1985-89 converted into offices by Richard Rogers).
Temple Bar Memorial, 1880. The elaborate pedestal in a Neo-Renaissance style, decorated with some reliefs as well as statues of Queen Victoria and The Prince of Wales, serves as the base for Charles Bell Birch's Griffin (but really a dragon), the symbol of the City of London.
Leadenhall Market, 1880–81.
former Guildhall School of Music and Drama, John Carpenter Street, completed in 1886.
Tower Bridge, approved design 1884, construction by John Wolfe Barry 1886–94. Jones' stonework in the Baronial Style, supposed to be in harmony with the nearby Tower of London, is pure facade which disguises the metal structure underneath.

Gallery

Notes and references

Sources

External links
 G. C. Boase, Jones, Sir Horace (1819–1887) rev. Valerie Scott, Oxford Dictionary of National Biography, 2004 (Subscription required)
 Sir Horace Jones, biography at the Tower Bridge Restoration website

1819 births
1887 deaths
19th-century English architects
Associates of the Royal Institute of British Architects
Architects from London
Burials at West Norwood Cemetery
Presidents of the Royal Institute of British Architects
Artists' Rifles soldiers